Monstera acacoyaguensis is a flowering plant in the family Araceae and the genus Monstera. its native range is Mexico (Chiapas) to Belize.

References 

acacoyaguensis
Vines